Nicolas Roche (born 3 July 1984) is an Irish former professional road bicycle racer who last rode for UCI WorldTeam . He has twice been national champion and has twice finished in the top ten of the Vuelta a España, and won stages in 2013 and 2015. He started a total of 24 Grand Tours, finishing 22, and he took a total of 65 top 10 finishes in Grand Tour stages, including 43 on the Vuelta. He represented Ireland at the 2008 Summer Olympics in the road race. He has competed for Ireland 7 times at the road world championships.

Early life
Roche, who was born in Conflans-Sainte-Honorine, in suburban Paris, is the son of former cycling champion Stephen Roche and his former wife, Lydia, nephew of former cycling professionals Laurence Roche and Neil Martin and cousin of 2008 Irish road champion Dan Martin.  In childhood he resided in both Ireland and France.  He lived in Dublin from 1996 to 1999, where he was educated at the Lycée Français d'Irlande in Foxrock for two years, and Blackrock College, a private school, for one year. During this period he was a keen soccer and rugby player. He moved to southern France in 1999, where he spent most of life since.

Career

Early years
He turned professional at the end of 2004, with team  and became one of the youngest UCI ProTour racers. As his father is Irish and his mother French, Roche had dual nationality as an amateur.  In early 2005, Roche was told by French officials to choose between his two nationalities. Roche declared for France as he was planning to spend the rest of his life in France. The loss of Roche was a blow to Irish cycling, as he had won the 2002 Junior Tour of Ireland and finished third in the 2004 Irish Elite championship. However, six months later, the UCI and Cycling Ireland told Roche he was given incorrect information, and that he could compete for Ireland and keep his two nationalities, which he did.

During his first two years, he was often a domestique, but he did get a few good results, mostly in French Cup races. His first win as a professional was a stage in the 2004 Tour de l'Avenir, a race known as a mini-Tour de France for riders under 25. He wore the yellow jersey for two days and finished tenth overall. He was in major breakaway in the 2006 World championships in Salzburg, Austria.

Credit Agricole (2007–2008)
In 2007, Roche rode the Giro d'Italia. In June, he won the Irish National Time Trial Championships (CN) in Dungarvan. He came also fourth in the Road Race Championship. Due to injury, Roche withdrew from the Tour of Ireland and missed the World Championship.

Roche had planned 2008 for the Giro d'Italia but organizers RCS did not invite his team. He changed his schedule, and finished sixth in the Tour Ivoirien de la Paix, 15th in Clásica Internacional de Alcobendas in Spain and won a stage in GP Internacional Paredes Rota dos Móveis in Portugal. After finishing seventh of the Tour de Wallonie, he competed in the Beijing Olympic road race, teaming with Philip Deignan, won a stage in the Tour du Limousin, and was then picked for his first Vuelta a España. Roche had good performances in the Vuelta, nearly winning stage 18 into Las Rozas, where he was outsprinted by Imanol Erviti after a 17-man breakaway. Roche had three top-ten and ten top-20 stage finishes, finishing a fine 13th in the general classification, during what was only his second Grand Tour. Roche along with Deignan and Roger Aiken made up the Irish team for the 2008 World Championship in Varese. Roche was in an early crash and retired.

Ag2r (2009–2012)

2009

He had a fine debut Tour, finishing in 23rd place overall and 5th in the points classification. He had five top ten placings in the race and finished 2nd on stage 14.

2010
After a good early season, where he finished 10th in Paris–Nice, 5th in the Volta a Catalunya and 2nd in the Irish National Road Race Championships, Roche was chosen as the co-leader of the  team in the Tour de France and during the race he wrote articles for the Irish Independent newspaper. Roche finished 15th overall, but could have been a few ranks above had he not lost four minutes to the race leaders because of a flat tyre in stage 15.

After the Tour, Roche finished 8th in the Clásica de San Sebastián and in September, he led  at the Vuelta a España. His performance was even better than during the Tour de France, as he was really close to the best climbers of the race, losing very little time in stages with a mountain top finish. He finished 7th overall however was promoted to 6th overall after Ezequiel Mosquera's second place was annulled. He finished only five minutes and three seconds behind overall winner Vincenzo Nibali. This place was the best in a Grand Tour by an Irishman since 1988. The performance lifted him to 32nd in the year end UCI World Rankings with 148 points. Roche was part of the three-man Irish team at the 2010 World Championships in September.

2011

Roche's season was hampered by injuries and crashes, particularly by one in the Critérium du Dauphiné He entered the Tour de France as a team leader again, but quickly realized he had not fully recovered from the crash and could not hope for a good general classification. He got in a number of unsuccessful breaks in the final week, hoping to grab a stage win, and eventually finished 26th overall. He also rode the Vuelta a España, finishing 16th overall.

In October, Roche won the 3rd stage of the inaugural Tour of Beijing. This marked his first international victory in three years and his first win on the World Tour. He finished the season world ranked 150th with 19 ranking points.

Roche published a memoir in 2011 called Inside the Peloton. It was the winner of the Sports Book category at that year's Irish Book Awards.

2012
Roche renounced his French citizenship in 2012, becoming solely an Irish national. He showed some form with top-20 finishes in Paris–Nice and the Tour of California. He finished 10th overall in the Tour de Suisse, and 2nd and 3rd respectively in the National Road Race and Time Trial Championships before riding the Tour de France. Roche moved up to seventh overall on the first mountain stage seven which finished on La Planche des Belles Filles. However he lost time over the time trial on stage nine and rest of the mountain stages. On stage 18, Roche broke clear of the peloton in the last  with Luis León Sánchez. The pair passed the day's breakaway and looked set to contest the stage win only to for Mark Cavendish to sprint past in the final . Roche sat 11th overall heading into the time trial on stage 20 and targeted a top ten finish, but a weak time trial saw him drop a place to 12th. Roche, along with Dan Martin and David McCann, represented Ireland in the Olympic Games Road Race. He then rode the Vuelta a España where he had a good start and sat seventh overall by the second week of the race. However, he struggled through the last week of the race and dropped down to 12th overall by the end of the race.

Tinkoff–Saxo (2013–2014)
On 1 August, it was announced that Roche would leave  at the end of the 2012 season, ending an eight-year association with French-registered teams.

2013

Throughout much of the season with  including the Tour de France, he rode as a domestique for Alberto Contador with few results. After a good performance at the Clásica de San Sebastián finishing 5th, he was given leadership at the Vuelta a España. On 25 August, Roche won stage two of the Vuelta by breaking away with three others on the final climb at the end of the  stage from Pontevedra to Alto Do Monte Da Groba. Roche held the leader's red jersey until stage 8, and also held the lead of the points, mountains and combination classifications at one stage in the race. On stage 8 Roche lost the jersey finishing eight seconds behind Daniel Moreno to fall one second behind in the general classification. After stage 13 Roche was 2nd overall but on a cold day to Andorra on stage 14 he dropped to 6th overall. He went on to finish 5th overall in the general classification, his best result to date in a Grand Tour. He would later state that he felt that the 2013 Vuelta was the highlight of his career. Later that year Roche again competed for Ireland in the World Championships and the World Time Trial Championships where he finished 13th.

2014
Roche had few early season results before participating in the Giro d'Italia which started on the island of Ireland and was given the role as co-leader with Rafał Majka. Roche also took part at the Tour de France as a domestique to Alberto Contador. Before the Tour, Roche won the overall classification of the Route du Sud ahead of Alejandro Valverde. He won the queen stage win in the process and also the points classification. This was his first stage race victory and was a race which his father also won in 1985. Roche went into the Tour of Britain expecting a good result and placed 5th overall.

Team Sky (2015–2016)

2015
In 2015, Roche left  to join . On 10 September, Roche won stage 18 of the Vuelta a España in a sprint finish against Haimar Zubeldia.

2016
After a disrupted winter training due to more than one spider infection while riding, Roche struggled with few early season results. At the end of April Roche competed in the Tour de Yorkshire looking for a good result. On the final stage Roche attacked a group of favourites alongside Thomas Voeckler where he was beaten in the final sprint to the line. This gave him 2nd place overall in the general classification. After this race it was confirmed that Roche would take part in the Giro d'Italia for a third time in his career. Roche started the race as a backup general classification rider to Mikel Landa in the first five days of racing, where he was placed in the top 10 overall. His form faded over the race but helped his teammate Mikel Nieve win the mountains classification. In June Roche completed the double at the Irish National Cycling Championships winning the time trial ahead of Eddie Dunbar and Ryan Mullen, and winning the road race ahead of Matt Brammeier. However, he was not selected for the Tour de France, having started the previous seven editions of the race from 2009 to 2015.

BMC Racing Team (2017–2018)

Team Sunweb (2019–2021)

Roche took the Red Jersey on Stage 2 of the 2019 Vuelta a España after being part of a six-man group who attacked in the final kilometres of the stage. He held the jersey until Stage 5, however he crashed out on stage 6, being one of four riders to abandon due to the crash. He was fifth in the general classification at the start of the stage.

In September 2019 it was announced that Roche had extended his contract with Team Sunweb for a further two years.

On 27 May 2021 he finished 3rd on Stage 18 of the Giro d'Italia.

Roche retired from competition after the Irish national road race championships in October 2021.

Personal life
Roche currently resides in Monaco, having previously lived in Varese, Italy until 2013. He married Spaniard Deborah Robles on 23 October 2015, the couple split two years later in September 2017. They have one child together. Roche co-owns Roca Sports, a bicycle shop in County Cork.

Media appearances

Dancing with the Stars 
In 2022, Roche appeared on the fifth series of the Irish version of Dancing With the Stars. He was partnered with professional dancer Karen Byrne. They were eliminated at the quarter-final stage, finishing in sixth place, after losing the dance-off to Ellen Keane and Ervinas Merfeldas.

Series 5 

 Dancing with the Stars performances
Average: 17.4; Place: 6th

Major results

2004
 2nd Overall Tour du Loir-et-Cher
 3rd Road race, National Road Championships
 8th Overall Ronde de l'Isard
 8th Paris–Mantes-en-Yvelines
 9th Tour du Jura
 10th Grand Prix d'Isbergues
2005
 4th Tour de Vendée
 6th Tour du Finistère
2006
 4th Road race, National Road Championships
 4th Overall Paris–Corrèze
 8th Polynormande
 10th Overall Tour de l'Avenir
1st Stage 4
 10th Paris–Camembert
2007
 National Road Championships
1st  Time trial
4th Road race
 5th Polynormande
 6th Grand Prix de Denain
 9th Paris–Camembert
 9th Tro-Bro Léon
2008
 1st Stage 1 GP Internacional Paredes Rota dos Móveis
 1st Stage 1 Tour du Limousin
 4th Road race, National Road Championships
 6th Overall Tour Ivoirien de la Paix
 6th Rund um den Henninger-Turm
 7th Overall Tour de Wallonie
 8th Paris–Camembert
2009
 1st  Road race, National Road Championships
2010
 2nd Road race, National Road Championships
 3rd Gran Premio dell'Insubria-Lugano
 4th Grand Prix of Aargau Canton
 5th Overall Volta a Catalunya
 6th Overall Vuelta a España
 8th Clásica de San Sebastián
 10th Overall Paris–Nice
2011
 1st Stage 3 Tour of Beijing
 4th Road race, National Road Championships
 5th Giro del Piemonte
 8th Gran Premio Industria e Commercio di Prato
 10th Paris–Camembert
2012
 National Road Championships
2nd Road race
3rd Time trial
 10th Overall Tour de Suisse
2013
 5th Overall Vuelta a España
1st Stage 2
 Held after Stage 8
 Held after Stages 2–3
 Held after Stages 2–9
 Held after Stages 2–8, 11–13
 5th Overall Tour Méditerranéen
 5th Clásica de San Sebastián
2014
 1st  Overall Route du Sud
1st  Points classification
1st Stage 2
 5th Overall Tour of Britain
  Combativity award Stage 11 Tour de France
2015
 1st Stage 18 Vuelta a España
 1st Stage 1 (TTT) Tour de Romandie
2016
 National Road Championships
1st  Road race
1st  Time trial
 2nd Overall Abu Dhabi Tour
 2nd Overall Tour de Yorkshire
 6th Overall Tour of Britain
 8th Time trial, UEC European Road Championships
 9th Clásica de San Sebastián
2017
 Vuelta a España
1st Stage 1 (TTT)
Held  after Stages 1–2
 1st Stage 1 (TTT) Volta a la Comunitat Valenciana
 National Road Championships
2nd Time trial
4th Road race
 3rd Overall Tour of Guangxi
 4th Giro dell'Emilia
 10th Clásica de San Sebastián
2018
 4th Japan Cup
 5th Overall Arctic Race of Norway
 10th Overall Tour of Turkey
2019
 10th Overall Tour de Suisse
 Vuelta a España
Held  after Stages 2–4
2020
 National Road Championships
2nd Road race
2nd Time trial
 7th Overall Tour des Alpes-Maritimes et du Var
  Combativity award Stage 6 Tour de France
2021
 2nd Time trial, National Road Championships

Grand Tour general classification results timeline

References

Further reading

External links

 
 
 
 
 Nicolas Roche at Cycling Base
 
 
 

1984 births
Living people
People from Conflans-Sainte-Honorine
Irish male cyclists
Cyclists at the 2008 Summer Olympics
Cyclists at the 2012 Summer Olympics
Cyclists at the 2016 Summer Olympics
Cyclists at the 2020 Summer Olympics
Olympic cyclists of Ireland
Irish Vuelta a España stage winners
People educated at Blackrock College